WE WISH (World Environmental Watching and Investigation from Space Height) was a small commercial CubeSat which was deployed from the International Space Station (ISS) in October 2012 and which deorbited in March 2013. It was built by the Japanese technology company Meisei Electric and the Meisei Amateur Radio Club, and could transmit pictures taken by a small infrared camera via radio at 437.515 MHz. WE WISH travelled to orbit aboard Kounotori 3 (HTV-3) on 21 July 2012, along with other CubeSats including RAIKO, FITSAT-1, F-1, and TechEdSat-1.

It was deployed, along with the other CubeSats, from Japanese Experiment Module (JEM) Kibō via the Japanese Experiment Module-Small Satellite Orbital Deployer (J-SSOD) system on 4 October 2012.

References 

Spacecraft which reentered in 2013
CubeSats
Spacecraft launched in 2012
Satellites deployed from the International Space Station